A hybrid zone exists where the ranges of two interbreeding species or diverged intraspecific lineages meet and cross-fertilize. Hybrid zones can form in situ due to the evolution of a new lineage but generally they result from secondary contact of the parental forms after a period of geographic isolation, which allowed their differentiation (or speciation). Hybrid zones are useful in studying the genetics of speciation as they can provide natural examples of differentiation and (sometimes) gene flow between populations that are at some point between representing a single species and representing multiple species in reproductive isolation.

Definition
Hybrid zones are areas where the hybrid offspring of two divergent taxa (species, subspecies or genetic "forms") are prevalent and there is a cline in the genetic composition of populations from one taxon to the other. The two (or more) genetically differentiated species or lineages contributing to formation of a hybrid zone are regarded as parental forms. Precise definitions of hybrid zones vary; some insist on increased variability of fitness within the zone, others that hybrids be identifiably different from parental forms and others that they represent secondary contact alone. The widths of such zones can vary from tens of metres to hundreds of kilometres. The shape of the zones (clines) can be gradual or stepped. Additionally, hybrid zones may be ephemeral or long-lasting.

Some hybrid zones can be seen as presenting a paradox for the biological definition of a species, usually given as "a population of actually or potentially interbreeding individuals that produce fertile offspring"  under what has become known as the Biological Species Concept. Under this definition, both parental forms could be argued to be the same species if they produce fertile offspring at least some of the time. However, the two parental populations or species often remain identifiably distinct, conforming to an alternative, and presently preferred concept of species as "taxa that retain their identity despite gene flow".

The clines of hybrid zones can be observed by recording the frequency of certain diagnostic alleles or phenotypic characteristics for either population along a transect between the two parental populations or species. Often the clines take the form of a sigmoidal curve. They can be wide (gradual) or narrow (steep) depending on the ratio of hybrid survival to recombination of genes. Hybrid zones which show no regular transition from one taxon to the other, but rather a patchy distribution of parental forms and subpopulations with hybrid background, are termed mosaic hybrid zones.

Forms
Hybrid zones can be either primary or secondary. Primary hybrid zones occur where divergence is taking place between adjacent populations of a previously homogeneous species, possibly leading to parapatric speciation. As a population spreads across a contiguous area it may spread into an abruptly different environment. Through adaptation to the new environment, the adjacent populations begin parapatric divergence. The point of contact between the older population and the newer population is ideally a stepped cline, but due to dispersal across the line, hybridization takes place and a hybrid zone arises. Secondary hybrid zones in turn arise from secondary contact between two populations that were previously allopatric. In practice it can be quite difficult to distinguish between primary and secondary contact by observing an existing hybrid zone. Most of the prominent, recognized hybrid zones are thought to be secondary.

One form of hybrid zone results where one species has undergone allopatric speciation and the two new populations regain contact after a period of geographic isolation. The two populations then mate within an area of contact, producing 'hybrids' which contain a mixture of the alleles distinctive for each population. Thus novel genes flow from either side into the hybrid zone. Genes can also flow back into the distinct populations through interbreeding between hybrids and parental (non-hybrid) individuals (introgression). These processes lead to the formation of a cline between the two pure forms within the hybrid zone. In the centre of such a cline, hybrizymes are commonly found. These are alleles that are normally rare in both species but, probably due to genetic hitchhiking on genes for hybrid fitness, reach high frequencies in the areas where most hybrids are formed.

Whereas some hybrid zones may break down due to selection against hybrid individuals (e.g. driving the evolution of reproductive character displacement) or merging of the parental forms, hybrid zones and gene flow do not inevitably lead to merging of the two populations involved, and some hybrid zones may be retained for thousands of years. Some persistent hybrid zones are 'tension zones', where the conflicting effects of dispersal of parental forms and selection against hybrids balance each other. Dispersal of individual parents leads to the creation of more hybrids within the hybrid zone. This may result in introgression between the two parental populations because of backcrossing. However, in the tension zone model, hybrids are less fit than parental forms (perhaps because they lack the coadapted gene complexes of the parentals that make them well adapted to the environments on either side of the hybrid zone), or even inviable or sterile. Inviability or sterility of hybrids forms a barrier to gene flow by making a 'hybrid sink' into which genes from parentals flow but rarely continue into the other parental population. Statistical models suggest that neutral alleles flow across this barrier very slowly, while positively selected alleles move across quite rapidly. An interesting outcome of this model is that tension zones are almost environment independent and can therefore move and empirical cases of this have been found.

In contrast to the tension zone model, the bounded hybrid superiority hypothesis predicts that hybrid fitness is enhanced in environments that are intermediate between those of the parental populations or lineages, yielding 'hybrid superiority'. Another model for a persistent hybrid zone is the ecotonal model, in which a hybrid zone occurs over an environmental gradient with each parental lineage being adapted to one part of that gradient. The frequency of alleles finding different equilibria therefore depends on the precise environmental conditions in a particular area. In each location, selection maintains a stable equilibria for each allele, resulting in a smooth cline. The hybrids must therefore be fitter at some point along the cline. Another model is the wave of advance model that sees multiple clines for individual alleles forming due to the progression of advantageous alleles from one population the other. Under the mosaic model, the hybrid zone is maintained by parentals distributed across the landscape among a mosaic of recurring hybrids which are selected against.

Certain factors contribute to stability and steepness of hybrid zones within these models by reducing the frequency of inter-population mating and introgression. These include positive assortative mating within populations, habitat selection of different populations and hybrid unfitness. Additionally, it is suggested that individuals in populations near a tension zone (in which hybrids are less fit), evolve methods of only mating with their own population to reduce the prevalence of unfit hybrids. This is dubbed reinforcement, and its importance remains controversial.

Marine hybrid zone case study 

Hybrid zones are thought to be less common in marine than terrestrial environments. However, blue mussel populations show extensive hybridisation worldwide and are a well studied example of a marine hybrid zone. There are multiple sites of hybridisation between the closely related species Mytilus edulis, Mytilus trossulus and Mytilus galloprovincialis across the North Atlantic and Pacific coasts. These hybrid zones vary considerably. Some hybrid zones, such as the one in Newfoundland in Canada show remarkably few hybrids, while in the Baltic Sea most individuals are hybrids.

Based on the fossil record and genetic marker studies the following chronology is used to explain the Canadian mussel hybrid zone:
M. trossulus evolves in the North Pacific and M. edulis in the Atlantic in near allopatry as migration across the Bering Strait is very low.
Recently, in post-glacial times, M. trossulus from the Pacific enters the Atlantic and colonises shores on both sides, and meets with the local M. edulis.

The Canadian mussel hybrid zone is unusual because both species are found along the entire shore (a mosaic pattern) instead of the typical cline found in most hybrid zones. Studies of mtDNA and allozymes in adult populations show that the distribution of genotypes between the two species is bimodal; pure parental types are most common (representing above 75% of individuals) while backcrosses close to parental forms are the next most prevalent. F1 hybrid crosses represent less than 2.5% of individuals.

The low frequency of F1 hybrids coupled with some introgression allows us to infer that although fertile hybrids can be produced, significant reproductive barriers exist and the two species are sufficiently deviated that they are now able to avoid recombinational collapse despite habitat sharing. One reason that could account for keeping taxa separate through prezygotic isolation is that in this region M. edulis spawns over a narrow 2–3 week period in July, while M. trossulus spawned over a more extensive period between late spring to early autumn. No infertility or developmental retardation was found in the hybrid individuals, allowing them to introgress with pure species.

See also
 Genetic pollution
 Hybrid swarm
 Hybrid speciation
 Introgression
 Hybrizyme

References 

Speciation
Population genetics